The Ministry of Industry, Energy and Technology is a government department in Newfoundland and Labrador, Canada. The department is headed by a member of the provincial cabinet, typically a Member of the House of Assembly, who is chosen by the premier and formally appointed by the Lieutenant-Governor of Newfoundland and Labrador. The current Minister of Industry, Energy and Technology is Andrew Parsons.

The department was formerly known as the Department of Mines and Energy, however its name was changed in 2004, to Natural Resources under the government of Danny Williams. The department is responsible for the provinces energy, mines, forestry and agrifoods sectors. Due to the significance of Newfoundland and Labrador's natural resources sector the Minister of Natural Resources is considered to be one of the most high-profile positions in the Provincial Cabinet.

On August 19, 2020 the department was renamed Industry, Energy and Technology.

Ministers
Key:

See also
Executive Council of Newfoundland and Labrador
Newfoundland Ranger Force, a former law enforcement agency while the Dominion of Newfoundland's Department of Natural Resources

References

External links
Industry, Energy and Technology website

Newfoundland and Labrador government departments and agencies
Newfoundland
Subnational economy ministries